Wanda Pleszczyńska (20 May 1903 – 17 December 1943) was a Polish painter. Her work was part of the painting event in the art competition at the 1928 Summer Olympics. She was killed in Pawiak prison by the Germans in World War II, after becoming a member of the Polish resistance.

References

1903 births
1943 deaths
20th-century Polish painters
Polish women painters
Olympic competitors in art competitions
Artists from Lublin
Polish civilians killed in World War II
Home Army members
Polish people executed by Nazi Germany
Resistance members killed by Nazi Germany
20th-century Polish women artists